Caianiello is an Italian surname. Notable people with the surname include:

Vincenzo Caianiello (1932–2002), Italian jurist
Eduardo R. Caianiello (1921–1993), Italian physicist
Andrea Caianiello (born 1987) Italian rower

Italian-language surnames